Beverly Elaine Aadland (September 16, 1942 – January 5, 2010) was an American film actress.

She appeared in films including South Pacific. As a teenager, she co-starred in the Errol Flynn film Cuban Rebel Girls, and had a relationship with him.

Early years
Aadland was born in the Hollywood neighborhood of Los Angeles. She entered show business as a child, appearing in the film Death of a Salesman (1951).

Biography
Beverly Elaine Aadland was 17 when she was with actor Errol Flynn as he died of a heart attack on October 14, 1959, in Vancouver, British Columbia at the age of 50. In 1961, Aadland's mother, Florence Aadland, alleged in the book The Big Love that actor Flynn had a sexual relationship with her daughter starting at age 15, yet there is also speculation he was led to believe she was 18. The book would be turned into a one-woman Broadway show starring Tracey Ullman as Florence. The memoir was reissued in 2018 by Spurl Editions. Beverly Aadland gave an account of her relationship with Flynn in People in 1988, confirming that she had had a sexual relationship with Flynn in her teens. Her relationship with Flynn was the subject of the 2013 movie The Last of Robin Hood, in which Aadland was played by Dakota Fanning.

Personal life 
In 1960, William Stanciu, her then boyfriend, died in her apartment after being shot in a struggle between the two. That event led to her being a ward of the court for the following year.

Aadland was married and divorced twice before she married Ronald Fisher in the late 1960s. The couple had a daughter.

Beverly Aadland Fisher died on January 5, 2010, at the Lancaster Community Hospital from complications of diabetes and congestive heart failure. She was 67 years old.

Filmography
 
 Death of a Salesman (1951) as girl (uncredited)
 South Pacific (1958) as Nurse in Thanksgiving Show
 Cuban Rebel Girls (1959) as Beverly Woods
 The Red Skelton Show (1959) as Beatnik Girl

References

External links
 
 

1942 births
2010 deaths
Actresses from Hollywood, Los Angeles
American child actresses
American film actresses
20th-century American actresses
21st-century American actresses